This is a comprehensive listing of official releases by MxPx, a three-piece American punk rock band, formed in 1992 in Bremerton, Washington. The band has released twelve studio albums, twenty singles, two cover albums, two live albums, an acoustic album, and other recordings.

Albums

Studio albums

Live albums

Compilation albums

Video albums

EPs

Songs

Singles

Compilation appearances
"I Can Be Friends With You" (1996) from Never Say Dinosaur, a tribute album to the contemporary Christian rock band Petra
"Scooby-Doo, Where Are You?" (2002) from the Scooby Doo movie soundtrack
"Shout" (2003) cover song and music video as part of the release of the Double Secret Probation Edition of Animal House.
"Christmas Night of the Living Dead" (2003) from A Santa Cause: It's A Punk Rock Christmas
"The Empire" (2004) co-written by Mark Hoppus for The Passion of the Christ soundtrack
"The Setting Sun" (2006) for the 3D Realms first person shooter Prey.
"Hey Porter" was covered for All Aboard: A Tribute to Johnny Cash in 2008.

References

Punk rock group discographies
Discographies of American artists